Soll das wirklich alles sein? (English: Is That Really All?) is the second studio album by Austrian recording artist Christina Stürmer. It was released by Universal Music subsidiary Amadeo on 8 June 2004 in Austria. As with her debut album Freier Fall (2003), Stürmer worked with Alexander Kahr on most of the album. Upon its release, Soll das wirklich alles sein? became her second number-one album and the fourth highest-selling album of the year in Austria. It was eventually certified 3× Platinum the International Federation of the Phonographic Industry (IFPI), indicating sales in excess of 90,000 copies.

Track listing

Charts

Weekly charts

Year-end charts

Certifications

References

External links 
 

Soll das wirklich alles sein
Soll das wirklich alles sein
Polydor Records albums
German-language albums